The Death of Yugoslavia (broadcast as Yugoslavia: Death of a Nation in the US) is a BBC documentary series first broadcast in September and October 1995, and returning in June 1996. It is also the title of a BBC book by Allan Little and Laura Silber that accompanies the series. It covers the collapse of Yugoslavia, the subsequent wars and the signing of the final peace accords. It uses a combination of archived footage interspersed with interviews with most of the main players in the conflict, including Slobodan Milošević, Radovan Karadžić, Franjo Tuđman and Alija Izetbegović, as well as members of the international political community, who were active in the various peace initiatives.

The series was awarded a BAFTA award in 1996 for Best Factual Series. It also won the 1995 Peabody Award and the 1997 Gold Baton at the Alfred I. duPont–Columbia University Awards. Interviews for the series have been used by ICTY in war crimes prosecutions.

All the papers relating to the documentary series, including the full transcripts of the interviews, are lodged at the Liddell Hart Centre for Military Archives at King's College, University of London.

Episodes

Edits
The series was later re-edited and released in three parts:
 "Enter Milošević"
 "The Croats Strike Back"
 "The Struggle for Bosnia"

In another edit, it was broadcast as a feature-length single documentary.

Interviewees

 Diego Arria, former President of the United Nations Security Council
 Blagoje Adžić, former Minister of Defence of Yugoslavia
 Milan Aksentijević, former General of JNA forces in Bosnia, Croatia and Slovenia
 Milan Babić, former President of the Republic of Serbian Krajina 
 Igor Bavčar, Slovenian politician 
 Mate Boban, former President of the Croat Republic of Herceg-Bosnia 
 Bogić Bogićević, former Yugoslav representative for SR Bosnia and Herzegovina 
 Dragoslav Bokan, Serbian film director and writer
 Josip Boljkovac, former Minister of Interior of Croatia
 Momir Bulatović, former President of SR Montenegro
 Lord Carrington, UN envoy 
 Warren Christopher, United States Secretary of State
 Vitaly Churkin, Russian diplomat
 Dobrica Ćosić, Yugoslav and Serbian politician
 Mile Dedaković, Croatian Army colonel
 Slavko Degoricija, Croatian politician
 Gianni De Michelis, former Minister of Foreign Affairs of Italy
 Jovan Divjak, Bosnian Serb general in the Bosnian Army
 Rasim Delić, chief of staff of the Bosnian army
 Raif Dizdarević, Bosnian politician
 Murat Efendić, Bosnian politician 
 Peter Galbraith, US Ambassador to Croatia 
 Ejup Ganić, Bosnian politician 
 Hans-Dietrich Genscher, former Minister of Foreign Affairs of Germany
 Mate Granić, Minister of Foreign Affairs of Croatia 
 Petar Gračanin, former Secretary of Interior of Yugoslavia 
 Mustafa Hajrulahović, general in the Bosnian Army
 Sefer Halilović, former commander of the Bosnian Army 
 David Hannay, British diplomat 
 Christopher R. Hill, American diplomat
 Richard Holbrooke, Assistant Secretary US State Department 
 Larry Hollingworth, head of UNHCR operations in Bosnia
 Douglas Hurd, Foreign Secretary of UK 
 Alija Izetbegović, President of the Republic of Bosnia 
 Janez Janša, Slovenian politician 
 , Serbian writer
 Borisav Jović, former President of the Presidency of Yugoslavia
 Perica Jurić – Croatian politician
 Radovan Karadžić, former President of Republika Srpska
 Donald Kerrick, Lieutenant General in US Army 
 Nikola Koljević, Vice President of Republika Srpska
 Branko Kostić, former President of the Presidency of Yugoslavia
 Momčilo Krajišnik, Speaker of the National Assembly of Republika Srpska
 Milan Kučan, former President of Slovenia
 Milutin Kukanjac, former General of JNA forces in Bosnia
 Zlatko Lagumdžija, Deputy Prime Minister of the Republic of Bosnia and Herzegovina
 Anthony Lake, United States National Security Advisor
 Lewis MacKenzie, chief of staff of the United Nations peacekeeping force in former Yugoslavia
 Branko Mamula, former Minister of Defence of Yugoslavia
 Milan Martić, former President of the Republic of Serbian Krajina
 Mirjana Marković, wife of Slobodan Milošević
 Josè Maria Mendiluce, UN representative in Bosnia
 Stjepan Mesić, Croatian politician
 Slobodan Milošević, former FR Yugoslavia president 
 Dušan Mitević, Serbian journalist 
 Philippe Morillon, UNPROFOR general
 Naser Orić, commander of the Bosniak forces in Srebrenica
 David Owen, British diplomat
 Života Panić, former Minister of Defence of Yugoslavia 
 Rosemary Pauli, US delegate during Dayton negotiations 
 Pavle – patriarch of the Serbian Orthodox Church
 Ilijaz Pilav, Srebrenica survivor, town council member 
 Biljana Plavšić, President of Republika Srpska
 Slobodan Praljak, Bosnian Croat general
 Armin Pohara, Bosnian actor
 Ivica Račan, Croatian politician
 , JNA general
 Charles Redman, American diplomat
 Jadranka, widow of Josip Reihl-Kir
 Malcolm Rifkind, UK Foreign Secretary
 Michael Rose, former Commander of UNPROFOR in Bosnia
 Zulfo Salihović, Bosnian politician
 Vojislav Šešelj, Serbian politician and paramilitary leader
 Haris Silajdžić, Prime Minister of Bosnia 
 Miroslav Šolević, Serb nationalist leader in Kosovo 
 Martin Špegelj, former Minister of Defence of Croatia
 Ivan Stambolić, former President of Serbia
 Shashi Tharoor, head of peacekeeping operations in former Yugoslavia
 Franjo Tuđman, President of Croatia
 Vasil Tupurkovski, former Member of the Presidency of Yugoslavia for SR Macedonia
 Miloš Vasić, Serbian journalist
 Aleksandar Vasiljević, head of the Counterintelligence Service of Yugoslavia
 Alexander Vershbow, American diplomat 
 Azem Vllasi, Kosovo Albanian politician
 Michael Williams, British diplomat
 Franci Zavrl, Slovenian journalist
 Warren Zimmermann, last US ambassador to SFR Yugoslavia

References

External links
 

1995 British television series debuts
1996 British television series endings
1990s British documentary television series
BAFTA winners (television series)
British television documentaries
Documentary television series about war
English-language television shows
Socialist Federal Republic of Yugoslavia
Television series about Yugoslavia
Works about the Bosnian War
Works about the Croatian War of Independence
Works about the Yugoslav Wars
Cultural depictions of Slobodan Milošević
Cultural depictions of Radovan Karadžić
Discovery Channel original programming
Films set in Belgrade
BBC television documentaries about history during the 20th Century
Documentary films about Yugoslavia